The Mandara  were an indigenous Australian people of the Pilbara region of Western Australia. They are extinct, having been absorbed into neighboring peoples, and their language is unrecorded.

Country
Compared to other highlander tribes in this area of the Puilbara, the Mandara were small in numbers, and were concentrated in parts of the Ophthalmia Range and the plateau area lying at the head of the Turee and Weediwolli creeks. Their southern confines touched Prairie Downs.

History
The Mandara were driven off their native grounds by a Völkerwanderung, or tribal migration phase in northwestern Australia that took place shortly before actually contact with Europeans occurred, in which the Kurrama pressured the Panyjima, who in turn moved southeast to exert pressure on tribes like the Mandara. The Mandara were compelled to shift north towards the Fortescue River, but eventually their remnants were absorbed by the Panyjima and the Niabali, who had been similarly affected.

Notes

Citations

Sources

Pilbara